Shoot the Moon is a 1982 film.

Shoot the Moon may also refer to:

Shoot the Moon (1996 film), a 1996 comedy film featuring Veronica Cartwright
Shooting the Moon, a 1998 Italian film
Shoot the Moon (Judie Tzuke album), 1982
Shoot the Moon: The Essential Collection, an album by Face to Face
Shoot the Moon (EP), a 1999 EP by Pinhead Gunpowder
 "Shoot the Moon", a song by Voodoo Glow Skulls from the album Firme
"I'll Shoot the Moon", a 1993 song by Tom Waits from The Black Rider
Shooting the moon, is a strategy in the card game Hearts
Shoot the Moon (dominoes), a variation of the dominoes game 42 played with 3 players
Shoot the Moon is a wooden Carnival game which requires skill to play.